Mortlake railway station is in the London Borough of Richmond upon Thames, in south London, and is in Travelcard Zone 3.

The station and all trains serving it are operated by South Western Railway. Postal district and boundary changes over many years mean that Mortlake now serves the area known as East Sheen as well as the area of Mortlake, both of which share the  postcode. Mortlake is the closest station to the finish of the Oxford-Cambridge University Boat Race.

History 
The station was opened on 27 July 1846, when the London and South Western Railway officially opened the line to Richmond for public service. Along with Richmond, it was not finished in time for a directors' special on 22 July 1846 and was still incomplete when the line opened due to delays in obtaining land.

The original station was said to be similar to neighbouring Barnes Station in its Tudor Gothic-style, but much smaller. The office at Mortlake was described as being very small, with a very small entrance room and a small inner room for the ladies' waiting-room. None of the original station survives.

It was renamed Mortlake & East Sheen in 1886, before it was renamed back to Mortlake in 1916.

Platforms and infrastructure 
The station has two platforms:
Platform 1 is an eastbound platform for services to London Waterloo via Clapham Junction.
Platform 2 is a westbound platform for services to London Waterloo via Richmond.

There is a ticket office on Platform 2 and a footbridge between the two platforms.

There is a level crossing just beyond the east end of the station. More than 3800 vehicles and nearly 2400 pedestrians use the crossing daily and 349 trains pass over the crossing each weekday. It is considered to be the fourth most risky CCTV-crossing on Network Rail's Wessex Route.

Services 

The typical off-peak service from the station is:

 Eight trains per hour to London Waterloo, of which:
Four run direct via Clapham Junction
Two run via Richmond, Kingston and Wimbledon
Two run via Richmond and Hounslow

Connections 
London Buses routes 419, 533, 969, and night route N22 serve the station.

References

External links 
Freeman, Leslie. The Coming of the Railway, Barnes and Mortlake History Society, June 1996
Visit Richmond

Former London and South Western Railway stations
Mortlake, London
Railway stations in the London Borough of Richmond upon Thames
Railway stations in Great Britain opened in 1846
Railway stations served by South Western Railway
1846 establishments in England